The Hunter 460 is an American sailboat that was designed by the Hunter Design Team as a cruiser and first built in 1999.

Production
The design was built by Hunter Marine in the United States, starting in 1999, but it is now out of production.

Design
The Hunter 460 is a recreational keelboat, built predominantly of fiberglass. It has a B&R masthead sloop rig, a raked stem, a walk-through reverse transom with a swimming platform and folding ladder, an internally mounted spade-type rudder controlled by a wheel and a fixed fin keel or optional bulb wing keel. With the fin keel it displaces  and carries  of ballast. With the wing keel it displaces  and carries  of ballast.

Factory options included a two cabin and workshop arrangement, a three cabin and four cabin configuration. Standard equipment included an electric halyard winch, self-draining transom propane lockers, dual offset anchor rollers and a full-beam aft cockpit.

The design has a PHRF racing average handicap of 105 with a high of 108 and low of 95.

See also
List of sailing boat types

Similar sailboats
Hunter 45
Hunter 456
Hunter 466

References

External links
Official brochure

Keelboats
1990s sailboat type designs
Sailing yachts
Sailboat type designs by Hunter Design Team
Sailboat types built by Hunter Marine